Blitz Research Ltd is an Auckland, New Zealand-based company which currently produces three BASIC based programming languages. Founded in 2000 by Mark Sibly, the company's first product was the now obsolete Blitz BASIC 2D, a PC version of the Amiga Blitz Basic. It was released the same year as the company's foundation. In 2001, Blitz3D was released. This allowed programmers to create 3D games and applications in Blitz Basic using DirectX.

In 2003, Blitz Basic 2D was rendered obsolete by the more recent BlitzPlus. BlitzPlus built on the foundations of Blitz Basic 2D and also allowed programmers to create true Microsoft Windows programs as well as games.

In December 2004, Blitz Research released the BlitzMax programming language for Mac OS X, Windows, and Linux. Unlike all the other Blitz programming languages, BlitzMax can use either OpenGL or DirectX.

In 2011, Blitz Research released the programing language Monkey along with Monkey X, a game engine producing C++, C#, Java, JavaScript, and ActionScript code, among other languages.

Blitz Research also produced the Maplet modelling tool, which is now no longer supported.

References

External links
Blitz Research subsite on itch.io (BlitzPlus, Blitz 3D, Monkey X, Monkey 2)
Monkey X subsite (open source)
Monkey 2 subsite
blitz-research (Mark Sibly) on GitHub (BlitzPlus, BlitzMax, Blitz3D, Monkey, BlitzMax, Blitz3D for MSVC-CE 2017)
Blitz Research website (archived 3 June 2017)
Monkey X website (archived 15 July 2017)

BASIC programming language
Software companies of New Zealand